Garry Kitchen's Super Battletank: War in the Gulf is a 1992 tank simulation single-player video game which takes place during Operation Desert Storm. The player controls an M1 Abrams main battle tank for the United Nations. A sequel, Super Battletank 2, was released for the Super NES in 1994.

Graphics
The screen is divided into two sections. One is the instrument panel in the gunner's station of the tank, and the other is a view of the outside, which consists primarily of the desert and military vehicles.

Gameplay
The player battles helicopter gunships, T72s, and Scud launchers, in pursuit of a military victory. The player had to use only M1 Abrams tank to play.

Re-releases
Majesco Entertainment released the game in 2001 for the Game Gear, as part of their licensed line of classic games for Game Gear, Mega Drive/Genesis, and Super NES; and making it by far the last release in North America for the Game Gear. It was also remade as Operation: Armored Liberty for Game Boy Advance in 2003.

Reception

Super Gamer reviewed the SNES version and gave an overall score of 54% summarizing: "Great graphics, but the sim-style looks are misleading while gameplay is extremely repetitive."

See also
Battletank

References

External links
 Super Battletank at MobyGames

1992 video games
Absolute Entertainment games
Game Boy Advance games
Game Boy games
Gulf War video games
Imagineering (company) games
Sega Genesis games
Single-player video games
Super Nintendo Entertainment System games
Tank simulation video games
Video games developed in the United States
Video games scored by Mark Van Hecke
Video games set in Iraq
Video games with historical settings